Guna, also called bolo-guna, is a Filipino weeding knife with a very short and wide dull blade with a perpendicular blunt end. It is an agricultural tool used mainly for digging roots and weeding gardens, approximating the functions of a garden hoe. It is the smallest type of bolo.

See also 
Gunong
Homi

References

Weapons of the Philippines